Style sheet may refer to:

 Style guide, often called "style sheet" synonymously inside the publishing industry
Style sheet (desktop publishing), a feature of desktop publishing programs.
 Style sheet language, a computer language that describes the presentation of structured documents
Style sheet (web development), W3C standards for web page style sheets such as 
 Cascading Style Sheets (CSS) or
 Extensible Stylesheet Language (XSL)